The 2012–13 Cincinnati Kings season was the fifth season of the Cincinnati Kings professional indoor soccer club. The Kings, an Eastern Division team and charter member of the Professional Arena Soccer League, played their home games at the GameTime Training Center in Fairfield, Ohio. The team was led by general manager Tim Burgess.

Season summary
The Kings were successful in the regular season, amassing an 11–5 record and placing second in the PASL's Eastern Division. The team qualified for the postseason and earned the right to play for the Ron Newman Cup in the PASL National Championship. The Kings lost both Eastern Division Finals games to the Detroit Waza and were eliminated from the postseason.

The Kings did not participate in the 2012–13 United States Open Cup for Arena Soccer.

Roster moves
On October 29, 2012, the Kings signed goalkeeper Jamie Lieberman, forward Andy Farrell, defender D.J. Albert, and midfielders Eddie Hertsenberg, Dan Dwyer, and Jeff Hughes. Hughes would also serve as the team's head coach.

On November 15, the team announced the release of forward Andy Farrell and the signings of forward Joshua Henderson plus defenders Roger Straz and Scott Shugh. Farrell re-signed with the Kings on December 14, 2012. On December 15, 2012, the team added defender Danijel Trifkovic to the roster.

Jeff Hughes was the team's head coach (and leading scorer as a midfielder) until he was released on January 25, 2013. (Hughes signed with the Missouri Comets of the MISL the same day.) Matt Breines took over as head coach with Jay Schneider as assistant coach.

On February 1, 2013, the Kings announced the signing of forward Roger Gemoules.

Awards and honors
On November 6, 2012, Kings midfielder (and head coach) Jeff Hughes was named the PASL Player of the Week for his team leadership and his scoring hat-trick against Detroit Waza in the King's season opener.

Schedule

Pre-season

Regular season

Postseason

References

External links
kingsindoor.com Cincinnati Kings official website

Cincinnati Kings
Sports in Cincinnati